Heacock is a surname. Notable people with the surname include:

Jim Heacock (born 1948), American football player and coach
Jon Heacock (born 1960), American football player and coach
Raymond Heacock (1928–2016), American aerospace engineer
Seth G. Heacock (1857–1928), American politician